Gunnar Stenbäck (October 31, 1880 – February 2, 1947) was a sailor from the Finland, who represented his native country at the Sailing at the 1912 Summer Olympics – 6 Metre in Nynäshamn, Sweden.

He was also known for designing the Hai. His son was Ragnar Stenbäck.

References

Sources
 
 

1880 births
1947 deaths
Finnish male sailors (sport)
Sailors at the 1912 Summer Olympics – 10 Metre
Olympic sailors of Finland
Sportspeople from Helsinki